William Jones (13 May 1864 – 16 July 1924) was an Australian cricketer. He played in two first-class matches for South Australia between 1881 and 1884.

See also
 List of South Australian representative cricketers

References

External links
 

1864 births
1924 deaths
Australian cricketers
South Australia cricketers
Cricketers from Adelaide